The 2017–18 Nevada Wolf Pack men's basketball team represented the University of Nevada, Reno during the 2017–18 NCAA Division I men's basketball season. The Wolf Pack, led by third-year head coach Eric Musselman, played their home games at the Lawlor Events Center in Reno, Nevada as members of the Mountain West Conference. They finished the season 29–8, 15–3 in Mountain West play to win the Mountain West regular season championship. They defeated UNLV in the quarterfinals of the Mountain West tournament before losing in the semifinals to San Diego State. They received an at-large bid to the NCAA tournament where they defeated Texas in the first round, then made a stunning 22-point comeback in the final 11 minutes of the game to beat Cincinnati. This tied the second largest comeback in terms of deficit in NCAA Tournament history. They then lost to eventual Final Four team Loyola Chicago in the Sweet Sixteen.

Previous season
The Wolf Pack finished the season 28–7, 14–4 in Mountain West play to win the Mountain West regular season championship. They defeated Utah State, Fresno State, and Colorado State to win the Mountain West tournament championship. They received the conference's automatic bid to the NCAA tournament where they lost in the first round to Iowa State.

Offseason

Departures

Incoming transfers

2017 recruiting class
Nevada did not have any incoming players in the 2017 recruiting class.

2018 recruiting class

Preseason 
In a vote by conference media at the Mountain West media day, the Wolf Pack were picked to win the Mountain West, receiving 19 of 24 first place votes. Junior forward Jordan Caroline was named to the preseason All-Mountain West team. Junior forward Caleb Martin, a transfer from NC State, was named the preseason Newcomer of the Year.

Roster

Schedule and results

|-
!colspan=9 style=| Exhibition

|-
!colspan=9 style=| Non-conference regular season

|-
!colspan=9 style=| Mountain West regular season

|-
!colspan=9 style=| Mountain West tournament

|-
!colspan=9 style=| NCAA tournament

Ranking movement

^Coaches Poll did not release a Week 2 poll at the same time AP did.
*AP does not release post-NCAA tournament rankings. Number in parenthesis indicates number of first place votes.

References

Nevada Wolf Pack men's basketball seasons
Nevada
Nevada
Nevada Wolf Pack
Nevada Wolf Pack